Daniel I-Chyau Wang (；March 12, 1936 – August 29, 2020) was an Institute Professor at the Massachusetts Institute of Technology. Wang received the SB (1959) and SM (1961) from MIT, and the PhD in chemical engineering from the University of Pennsylvania in 1963. He joined the MIT faculty in 1965 and was a member both of the National Academy of Engineering and the American Academy of Arts and Sciences. He has co-authored five books and more than 100 papers in professional journals. He founded the Biotechnology Process Engineering Center. His research on fermentation, monitoring and control of bioprocesses, renewable resource utilization, enzyme technology, product recovery and purification, protein aggregation and refolding, and mammalian cell cultures made him a pioneer in biochemical and biological engineering.

References

External links
MIT News Office - Institute Professor press release
MIT faculty webpage - Chemical Engineering
DIC Wang Group
National Academy of Engineering Citation

21st-century American engineers
MIT School of Engineering faculty
2020 deaths
1936 births
Members of the United States National Academy of Engineering
Fellows of the American Academy of Arts and Sciences
American chemical engineers
American people of Chinese descent